Guillaume Lacour (born 2 August 1980) is a French former professional footballer who played as a midfielder. He joined Évian from RC Strasbourg in July 2010, following an eight-year stint where he appeared in more than 200 league matches. While at Strasbourg Lacour played as they won the 2005 Coupe de la Ligue Final. Lacour finished his playing career with AS Troyes.

References

External links

1980 births
Living people
Association football midfielders
French footballers
Olympique Lyonnais players
RC Strasbourg Alsace players
Thonon Evian Grand Genève F.C. players
ES Troyes AC players
Ligue 1 players
Ligue 2 players